The 1973 Fidelity Tournament – Singles was an event of the 1973 Fidelity Tournament men's tennis tournament played at the Richmond Coliseum in Richmond, Virginia in the United States from January 30 through February 4, 1973. The draw comprised 32 players and 10 of them were seeded. Rod Laver was the defending champion. First-seeded Laver won the singles title, defeating seventh-seeded Roy Emerson 6–4, 6–3 in the final.

Seeds

Draw

Finals

Top half

Bottom half

References

External links
 ITF tournament edition details

Richmond WCT
Richmond WCT
Richmond WCT
Tennis in Virginia